Bijepur is a Vidhan Sabha constituency of Odisha.
This constituency includes Bijepur block, Gaisilat block and Barpali block.

Elected Members

17 elections held during 1961 to 2019 including By-Elections. List of members elected from this constituency are: 
 2019 (By-Election): Rita Sahu (BJD)                   
 2019 : Naveen Patnaik (BJD) (Resigned)
 2018 (By-Election): Rita Sahu (BJD)
 2014: Subal Sahu (Congress)
 2009: Subal Sahu (Congress)
 2004: Subal Sahu (Congress)
 2000: Ashok Kumar Panigrahy (BJD)
 1995: Ripunath Setha (Congress)
1991: (By-Election): Kishorimani Singh (Janata Dal)
 1990: Nikunja Bihari Singh (Janata Dal)
 1985: Nikunja Bihari Singh (Janata Dal)
 1980: Rajib Lochan Hota (Congress)
 1977: Nityananda Gadatia (Janata Party)
 1974: Gananatha Pradhan (Utkal Congress)
 1971: Tribikram Malik, (Congress (J))
 1967: Mohan Nag (Congress)
 1961: Mohan Nag (Congress)

Election results

2019 By-Election
In 2019 By-Election, Biju Janata Dal candidate Rita Sahu defeated Bharatiya Janata Party candidate Sanat Kumar Gartia  by a margin of 97,990 votes.

2019 
In 2019 election, Biju Janata Dal candidate Naveen Patnaik defeated Bharatiya Janata Party candidate Sanat Kumar Gartia  by a margin of 57,122 votes. Later Naveen Patnaik has resigned as MLA from the Bijepur Assembly Constituency.

2014 
In 2014 election, Indian National Congress candidate Subal Sahu defeated Biju Janata Dal candidate Prasanna Acharya by a margin of 458 votes.

2009 
In 2009 election Indian National Congress candidate Subal Sahu, defeated Biju Janata Dal candidate Prabhat Aditya Mishra by 18,066 votes.

References

Bargarh district
Assembly constituencies of Odisha